Ab Shirin (also Romanized as Āb Shīrīn) is a village in Jaydasht Rural District, in the Central District of Firuzabad County, Fars Province, Iran. At the 2006 census, its population was 89, in 22 families.

References 

Populated places in Firuzabad County